Jack Marchal (19 September 1946 – 1 September 2022) was a French musician, illustrator, and activist of the far-right.

Biography
Marchal joined the political movement Occident in 1966 and was a founding member of the Groupe Union Défense in 1968. He was also a part of the political and press offices of the Ordre Nouveau. He would rejoin the National Front in 1984.

Marchal was known for writing the characters "rat noir", inspired by illustrations from Raymond Macherot. These characters appeared in the soap opera "Les Rats maudits", published in the satirical newspaper Alternative.

In the late 1990s, Marchal wrote rock identitaire français music and served as the guitarist for the group Elendil.

Marchal died on 1 September 2022, at the age of 75.

Publications
Histoire de la civilisation racontée aux enfants (1975)
Les Rats maudits : histoire des étudiants nationalistes, 1965-1995 (1995)

Discography
Science and Violence (1979)

References

External links
 

1946 births
2022 deaths
French musicians
French illustrators
French draughtsmen
Occident (movement) politicians
Party of New Forces politicians
National Rally (France) politicians